Titulcia is a municipality of the Community of Madrid, Spain.

History
Supposedly of Roman origin, Titulcia is situated on the ancient military road from Emerita Augusta and Cesaraugusta (now Zaragoza). With the arrival of the Arabs, the city was razed, but it regained its previous significance during the Reconquest and thereafter taking the name of Bayonne (c. 1208)

Its strategic position was recognized by the French occupiers during the Napoleonic Wars, who held it until 1814. After the defeat of the French, the town recovered its original name at the insistence of King Fernando VII.

The city was destroyed, for the fifth time in its history, during the Spanish Civil War, when it was the divisional headquarters of Republican forces.

Fiestas
Fiesta del día del Hornazo, a sort of hot cross bun to celebrate Christ's Resurrection on Easter Sunday
Fiesta de la Virgen del Rosario (Our Lady of the Rosary), last week in August

References

External links
 http://www.titulcia.org/
 Rural Development Association Website (in Spanish) La Asociación de Desarrollo Rural Aranjuez-Comarca de las Vegas (ARACOVE)

Municipalities in the Community of Madrid